The Ballroom of Romance is a 1982 TV movie directed by Pat O'Connor, based on a short story by William Trevor.

Plot
County Leitrim, the 1950s. Bridie has been attending the local dance hall for years in the hope of finding a good husband who can help work her family's farm. Now surrounded by younger prettier women at the dances,  she comes to the realization that all the good men of her generation have emigrated or have been spoken for; and her only remaining hope for marriage is with the alcoholic and unreliable Bowser Egan.

Cast

Background and production
The Ballroom of Romance was based on a short story by William Trevor set in County Leitrim, Ireland. The film was shot on location in Ballycroy, County Mayo as by 1982 the ballroom which William Trevor had originally written about had been modernized and no longer resembled a dance hall typical of 1950s Ireland.

Almost all of the production personnel involved in the BBC/RTÉ co-production ‘Ballroom of Romance’ came from the BBC, along with Producer Kenith Trodd.

The banner seen at the dance, "Happy Homes for Ireland and for God," was taken from a real banner that O'Connor remembered from his youth.

The RTÉ participation in the production consisted of Director Pat O’Connor and Editor Maurice Healy. The post-production (Editing) was carried out at RTÉ in Dublin, in  early 1982.

Sound mixing was done at BBC Lime Grove Studios in Shepherd’s Bush, London. Rank Film Laboratories in Denham supplied the film prints for the television broadcasts.

Extras were from the locals from within the Ballycroy area.

Reception
The film is considered a classic. Bob Geldof described The Ballroom of Romance as his favourite Irish film, "full of that empty, sad despair and hopelessness that is in the character, as evidenced in drink, music, Catholicism, desperate pursuit of ‘the craic’ and dangerously overwrought politics."

In 2012, it was the subject of a documentary on RTÉ Radio 1, A Backwards Glance At The Ballroom of Romance.

In 2019, it was shown at the Irish Film Institute, Sunniva O’Flynn calling it "a perfectly observed evocation of the desolation and despair of Irish country life in the 1950s."

In 2022, an exhibition of behind-the-scenes images from the film went on show at Linenhall Arts Centre, Castlebar.

Scholarly analysis has noted that the film was produced at a time when Ireland was beginning to become a wealthy, industrialised nation, as European Economic Community membership brought factories and development. Luke Gibbons wrote that it "provided a focus for the reassuring belief that the fifties were no longer with us... Viewers could confront the harsh realities of poverty, emigration, sexual repression and the enforced domestication of women, secure in the knowledge that ‘The factory was coming to town.’"

References

External links

1982 films
Films based on works by William Trevor
Films directed by Pat O'Connor
1982 romantic drama films
Films based on short fiction
1980s English-language films
Films set in the 1950s
Films shot in County Mayo
Films set in the Republic of Ireland
Irish television films
RTÉ original programming
BBC Film films